David Martin and Simon Stadler are the defending champions; however, they didn't play together.
David Martin partnered up with Philipp Marx; however, they lost to Brian Battistone and Ryler DeHeart in the quarterfinals.
Simon Stadler chose to compete with Tobias Kamke, but lost in the first round to Yves Allegro and Jeff Coetzee.
Uladzimir Ignatik and David Marrero won the doubles competition, after their won against Brian Battistone and Ryler DeHeart in the final (4–6, 6–4, [10–5]).

Seeds

Draw

Draw

References
Doubles Draw

Open Prevadies- Doubles
2010 Doubles